Fentange is a town in the commune of Hesperange, in southern Luxembourg.  , the town has a population of 1,626.
Notable citizens are Bière Peck, Leangro Duschtert and Signore Miguel Lauer

References

Hesperange
Towns in Luxembourg